The 1858 Bradford sweets poisoning was the arsenic poisoning of more than 200 people in Bradford, England, when sweets accidentally made with arsenic were sold from a market stall. Twenty-one victims died as a result. The event contributed to the passage of the Pharmacy Act 1868 in the United Kingdom and legislation regulating the adulteration of foodstuffs.

Background
William Hardaker, known to locals as "Humbug Billy", sold sweets from a stall in the Greenmarket in central Bradford (now the site of Bradford's Arndale Centre). Hardaker purchased his supplies from Joseph Neal, who made the sweets (or "lozenges") on Stone Street a few hundred yards to the north. The lozenges in question were peppermint humbugs, made of peppermint oil incorporated into a base of sugar and gum. However, sugar was expensive (6½d per ) and so Neal would substitute powdered gypsum (½d per ) — known as "daff" — for some of the required sugar. The adulteration of foodstuffs with cheaper substances was common at the time and the adulterators used obscure nicknames ("daff", "multum", "flash", "stuff") to hide the practice.

Accidental poisoning
On the occasion in question, on 30 October 1858, Neal sent James Archer, a lodger who lived at his house, to collect daff for Hardaker's humbugs from druggist Charles Hodgson. Hodgson was at his pharmacy, but did not serve Archer owing to illness and so his requests were seen to by his young assistant, William Goddard. Goddard asked Hodgson where the daff was, and was told that it was in a cask in a corner of the attic. However, rather than daff, Goddard sold Archer  of arsenic trioxide.

The mistake remained undetected even during manufacture of the sweets by James Appleton, an "experienced sweetmaker" employed by Neal, though Appleton did observe that the finished product looked different from the usual humbugs. Appleton was suffering symptoms of illness during the sweet-making process and was ill for several days afterwards with vomiting and pain in his hands and arms, but did not realise it was caused by poison.  of lozenges were sold to Hardaker who also noticed the sweets looked unusual and used this to obtain a discount from Neal. Like Appleton, Hardaker, as one of the first to taste the sweets, also promptly became ill.

Of those who purchased and ate the sweets, 21 people died with a further 200 or so becoming severely ill with arsenic poisoning within a day.

Consequences
Originally the first deaths—those of two children—were thought to be owed to cholera, a major problem in Britain at the time. The growing number of casualties soon showed that the purchase of lozenges from Hardaker's stall was the cause, and from there the trail led to Neal and Hodgson. Goddard was arrested and stood before magistrates in the court house in Bradford on 1 November with Hodgson and Neal later committed for trial with Goddard on a charge of manslaughter. Dr John Bell identified arsenic as the cause, and this was confirmed by Felix Rimmington, a prominent druggist and analytical chemist. Thus, each lozenge would have contained enough arsenic to kill two people, and enough distributed by Hardaker in total to kill 2,000. The prosecution against Goddard and Neal was later withdrawn and Hodgson was acquitted when the case was considered at York Assizes on 21 December 1858.

The tragedy and resulting public outcry was a major contributing factor to The Pharmacy Act 1868 which recognised the chemist and druggist as the custodian and seller of named poisons (as medicine was then formally known). The requirement for record keeping and the requirement to obtain the signature of the purchaser is currently upheld under the Poisons Act 1972 for "non-medicinal" poisons. W. E. Gladstone's ministry of 1868–1874 also brought in legislation regulating the adulteration of foodstuffs as a result of the events.

References
Notes

Bibliography

Bradford
Bradford
1850s health disasters
Adulteration
Arsenic
Food safety scandals
Disasters in Yorkshire
History of Bradford
Mass poisoning
Poisoning by drugs, medicaments and biological substances
Health disasters in the United Kingdom
Food safety in the United Kingdom
History of forensic science
19th century in Yorkshire
October 1858 events